Liam O'Connor (born 13 July 1995) is an Irish rugby union player for Munster in the United Rugby Championship. He plays as a prop and represents Cork Constitution in the All-Ireland League.

Early life
O'Connor was born in Cork and first played rugby aged 7 with Dolphin RFC. He then attended Christian Brothers College and represented the school in Junior and Senior Cup rugby. He has played for Munster at Under-18, Under-19, Under-20 and 'A' level, as well as representing Ireland at Under-19 and Under-20 level. O'Connor also played football at underage level for Delaneys and, aged just 16, played in goal for St. Nicks in the Cork Senior Football Championship.

Munster
On 16 January 2016, O'Connor made his competitive debut for Munster when he came on as a substitute against Stade Français in a 2015–16 European Rugby Champions Cup fixture. O'Connor made his first start for Munster on 1 September 2017, doing so in the sides opening fixture of the 2017–18 Pro14 against Benetton. He signed a two-year senior contract with Munster in January 2018. O'Connor was nominated for the 2018 John McCarthy Award for Academy Player of the Year in April 2018. O'Connor made his return from a knee injury sustained during Munster's game against Ospreys in December 2017 in their fixture against Dragons on 26 January 2019.

O'Connor signed a two-year contract extension with Munster in January 2020, and signed a one-year contract extension in January 2022. He featured off the bench in Munster's historic 28–14 win against a South Africa XV in Páirc Uí Chaoimh on 10 November 2022.

References

External links

Munster Profile
URC Profile

Living people
1995 births
People educated at Christian Brothers College, Cork
Rugby union players from County Cork
Irish rugby union players
Cork Constitution players
Munster Rugby players
Rugby union props